Aleuas or Alevas can refer to more than one person from ancient Greek myth and history:

Aleuas, the mythical king and seer of Thessaly who was the eponymous ancestor of the noble Aleuadae family of Larissa.  See: Aleuadae.
Aleuas, a historical artist who was famous in his day for his statues of philosophers.

References

Heracleidae
Ancient Greek sculptors
Mythological kings of Thessaly
Mythological Greek seers